The 10th Army was an army level command of the German Army in World War I formed in January 1915 in Cologne.  It served exclusively on the Eastern Front.  It was dissolved on 6 January 1919.

History 
During World War I the 10th Army was stationed on the Eastern Front where it fought against Russia. It also took part in the occupation of Poland and Belorussia at the end of 1918 when the war ended.

The Tenth Army published the newspaper "Zeitung der 10. Armee" ("Newspaper of the 10th Army").

Commanders 
The 10th Army had the following commanders:

Glossary 
Armee-Abteilung or Army Detachment in the sense of "something detached from an Army".  It is not under the command of an Army so is in itself a small Army.
Armee-Gruppe or Army Group in the sense of a group within an Army and under its command, generally formed as a temporary measure for a specific task.
Heeresgruppe or Army Group in the sense of a number of armies under a single commander.

See also 

10th Army (Wehrmacht) for the equivalent formation in World War II
Great Retreat (Russian)
Lake Naroch Offensive

References

Bibliography 
 
 

10
Military units and formations established in 1915
Military units and formations disestablished in 1919